Monzogranites are biotite granite rocks that are considered to be the final fractionation product of magma. Monzogranites are characteristically felsic (SiO2 > 73%, and FeO + MgO + TiO2 < 2.4), weakly peraluminous (Al2O3/ (CaO + Na2O + K2O) = 0.98–1.11), and contain ilmenite, sphene, apatite and zircon as accessory minerals. Although the compositional range of the monzogranites is small, it defines a differentiation trend that is essentially controlled by biotite and plagioclase fractionation. (Fagiono, 2002). Monzogranites can be divided into two groups (magnesio-potassic monzogranite and ferro-potassic monzogranite) and are further categorized into rock types based on their macroscopic characteristics, melt characteristics, specific features, available isotopic data, and the locality in which they are found.

Monzogranite rock types
MGr type I: Muscovite-biotite-metagranite. Small and equal grained, greyish-brown, yellow altered K-fsp (Saladillo, S. Chepes).

MGr type II: Muscovite-metagranite. Medium grained, porphyric, pink K-fsp, with "schollen", whitish-pink (with "Schollen").

MGr type III: Schollen-metagranite. Medium and equal grained, large and many "schollen", whitish-grey, only biotite (Tuaní, S. Chepes and S. Ulapes south).
 
MGr type IV: Biotite-metagranite. Medium to large, porphyric or equal grained pink K-fsp, reddish quartz  (Chimenea, S. Chepes).
MGr type V: Metagranite. Medium and equal grained reddish K-fsp whitish (El Abra, S. Ulapes).

MGr type V aplite: Metagranite, aplite dikes and layers. Pink small and equal grained, whitish K-fdsp, grey quartz, pink-white (S. Ulapes north).

Examples

Pilgangoora belt, Pilbara craton
Pilbara Granite–Greenstone Terrane c. 3.315 Ga monzogranites are typically highly fractionated, K rich, Al poor, and have trace element compositions consistent with remelting of an older tonalitic–trondhjemitic–granodioritic (TTG) crust.

Carlindi monzogranites in the greenstone belt are light greyish-pink coloured, "massive, coarse-grained (<5 cm), holocrystalline and composed of plagioclase (30–40%), quartz (30–40%), microcline (25–30%), mafic minerals (<5%), and muscovite (<5%). In general, the texture is similar to granodiorites, with zoned subhedral plagioclase, and anhedral microcline and quartz. However, microcline is commonly poikilitic, with abundant fine-grained plagioclase and quartz. Monzogranites contain medium-grained subhedral muscovite and sometimes trace amounts of embayed, corroded fine-grained garnet." (Green, 2001).

Quebec's near north
In Quebec's near north, early monzogranites are moderately fractionated (Rb/Sr = 0.15–3.9) and show moderate to high La/YbCN (14–106) and Zr/Y (4-52) ratios. On a Rb vs Sr diagram, these rocks plot at the edge of the "fertile" granite field, although rare metal contents are low (Li = 6–55 ppm, Be = 1–3 ppm and Ta = 0.1–0.5). However, late granites and pegmatitic granites are more fractionated (Rb/Sr = 0–48) and fertile. They show variable but commonly high Li (2–157 ppm), Be (1–6 ppm) and Ta (0.1–5.8 ppm) contents. These granites exhibit strong Eu anomalies, low REE contents and low to moderate [La/Yb]CN (0.2–45) ratios. (Boiley and Gosselin, 2003)

Vigo–Regua shear zone, northern Portugal
In northern Portugal, along the Vigo–Régua shear zone, the monzogranites belong to the syn-F3 biotite granitoid group. They present a porphyritic texture (potassium feldspar megacrysts) and mafic microgranular enclaves that decrease in frequency from south to north. The granites are composed of quartz + potassium feldspar + plagioclase (andesine/oligoclase) + biotite + zircon + monazite + apatite + ilmenite ± muscovite. The studied granodiorites-monzogranites are moderately peraluminous, [(A/KNC)m:1.19–1.39], with SiO2 contents between 62 and 70%. (Simoes, 2000).

Gabal El-Urf area, eastern Egypt
Granitoids in the Gabal El-Urf area in eastern Egypt consist of a monzogranite pluton, belonging to the Younger Granite province, emplaced in granodioritic rocks. "The monzogranites (72–77% SiO2) are metaluminous to mildly peraluminous, highly fractionated and depleted in Al2O3, MgO, CaO, TiO2, Sr and Ba with corresponding enrichment in Rb, Nb, Zr, and Y. They can be correlated with the undeformed post-orogenic granites in the Arabian–Nubian Shield that chemically resemble A-type granites emplaced in extensional settings. The mineralogical and chemical variations within the granodiorites and monzogranites are consistent with their evolution by fractional crystallization. The granodiorites have a low initial 87Sr/86Sr ratio (0.7024) and high [set membership]Nd values (+6.9–+7.3) and are significantly different from those (initial 87Sr/86Sr ratio=0.7029, [set membership]Nd values=+5.2–+5.8) of the monzogranites. These data suggest a predominant mantle derivation for both granite types and demonstrate that they originated from different source materials.
In the Wadi El-Sahu Area, Southwestern Sinai, the radioactivity of the studied gneisses is very low, but the younger granites are moderately radioactive. The monzogranite is relatively higher on radioactivity than the syenogranite. Both of them are characterized by variable eTh/eU ratios and disequilibrium state referring to mobility of uranium. The radioelements of these granites are incorporated in their accessory minerals such as zircon, xenotime and allanite.
The granodiorite melt was most probably generated through vapour-saturated partial melting of an early Neoproterozoic depleted mafic lower-crust reservoir due to crustal thickening associated with orogenic compression and/or arc magma underplating. The mineralogical and geochemical data of the A-type monzogranites are consistent with their derivation as a residual granitic liquid from a LILE-enriched mafic magma through crystal-liquid fractionation of plagioclase, amphibole, Fe–Ti oxides and apatite. The parental mafic magma was originated in the upper mantle due to crustal thinning associated with extension in the late stage of the Neoproterozoic crustal evolution of north-eastern Egypt." (Moghazi, 1999).

Southern Variscan belt in southern Europe
In the southern Variscan belt, Iberia, the Beiras massif Tamanhos, Maceira and Casal Vasco, of Southern Europe, biotite monzogranites "vary from slightly peraluminous granodiorites to highly peraluminous monzogranites (SiO2 = 60–72%; A/CNK = 1.0–1.37) and are characterized by low Al2O3/TiO2 and high CaO/Na2O ratios. CaO/Na2O ratio in peraluminous melts is predominantly controlled by the plagioclase/clay ratio of the source being therefore unlikely that granite melts with high CaO/Na2O ratios could be produced by simple partial melting of mature sedimentary protoliths (plagioclase-poor metapelites). A more immature quartzofeldsphatic-rich (greywackes) and/or metaigneous (tonalites-granodiorites) crustal source may therefore be proposed. However, high CaO/Na2O ratios can also result from mixing of strongly peraluminous crustal melts with basaltic magmas." (Aguado, 2005).

See also
 List of rock types
 Igneous rocks

References

 Aguado, Beatriz Valle, M. Rosário Azevedo, John Nolan, and M. Estela Martins. (2005) "Origin and emplacement of syn-orogenic Variscan granitoids in Iberia the Beiras massif." Journal of the Virtual Explorer, 2005 issues, Vol. 19.
 Boiley, Miche, and Charles Gosselin. (2003) "Rare metal potential in the Near North, Québec." Geoscience Exhibit.
 Fagiono, M. R., F. E. Nullo, J. E. Otamendi, et al. (2002) "Geología, petrología y mineralogía del granito Inti Huasi, sur de la sierra de Comechingones, Córdoba." Rev. Asoc. Geol. Argent., oct./dic. 2002, vol. 57, no. 4, p. 389–403. ISSN 0004-4822. Online Summary:
 Green, Michael Godfrey. (2001) "Early Archaean Crustal Evolution: Evidence from ~3.5 Billion Year Old Greenstone Successions in the Pilgangoora Belt, Pilbara Craton, Australia." dissertation, School of Geosciences, Division of Geology and Geophysics, University of Sydney:
 Moghazi, Abdel-Kader M. (1999) "Magma source and evolution of Late Neoproterozoic granitoids in the Gabal El-Urf area, Eastern Desert, Egypt: geochemical and Sr–Nd isotopic constraints." Geological Magazine (1999), 136, pp. 285–300. Online Abstract:
 Simoes, Pedro Pimenta. (2000) "Emplacement, geochronology and petrogenesis of the syntectonic biotite-granitoids associated with the Vigo-Régua shear zone (Hercynian Central Iberian Zone, Northern Portugal)." PhD thesis presented at University of Minho and University of Nancy (France). Online Abstract: 

Granite